"Ça plane pour moi" is a 1978 song by Belgian musician Plastic Bertrand, though its vocals were actually performed by Lou Deprijck, the record's producer and composer. "Jet Boy, Jet Girl", a song by Elton Motello, has the same backing track that was later used in "Ça plane pour moi". 

The song has been covered by many artists, though Plastic Bertrand's original recording was the most successful, reaching No. 8 on the UK charts in the summer of 1978. While mainly regarded as a punk song, "Ça plane pour moi" has also been described as parody punk and as new wave. The song's name is a French idiomatic expression that is best translated as "everything's going well for me" (literally: "it is gliding for me").

Background
"Ça plane pour moi" was conceived as a pastiche, a caricature of the punk movement. Lou Deprijck explained:

The music was recorded by Mike Butcher (guitar), John Valcke (bass) and Bob Dartsch (drums), and the song was released as a B-side to "Pogo-Pogo", which was chosen to launch the solo career of Plastic Bertrand. However, following the success of the B-side, the sides were switched when the single was repressed. It took two hours to record "Ça plane pour moi" and "Pogo-Pogo".

Composition
"Ça plane pour moi" is a three-chord rock song that features nonsensical French lyrics with occasional lines in English. Lou Deprijck claims that "The lyrics are a sequence of unconnected things, that a guy, who is stoned, thinks he sees". Steve Huey from AllMusic describes the song melody as a "... four-note hook which sounds like something straight out of an early Beach Boys or Four Seasons song" that Roger Jouret (Plastic Bertrand) sings in a "dead-on falsetto." This melody is created by "... mildly distorted guitars, plus a steadily pumping rhythm section and an old-time rock & roll-style saxophone ... hardly used for anything other than rhythmic accompaniment." Huey also qualifies Jouret's voice as "cartoonish" and that it "... stays in a monotone as he recites all the lyrics."

Reputation
The song was praised by Joe Strummer: "Plastic Bertrand compressed into that three minutes a bloody good record that will get any comatose person toe-tapping, you know what I mean? By purist rules, it's not allowed to even mention Plastic Bertrand. Yet, this record was probably a lot better than a lot of so-called punk records."

Chart performance
"Ça plane pour moi" became a hit in several European countries, peaking at No. 19 in Austria, No. 12 in Sweden, No. 11 in Bertrand's native Belgium, No. 8 in the U.K., No. 6 in West Germany, No. 4 in Ireland, No. 2 in the Netherlands, No. 7 in New Zealand and  No. 2 in Australia. It also topped the Swiss charts for one week and the French charts for two consecutive weeks.

In the U.S., the single peaked at No. 47 on the Billboard Hot 100, a feat for a French-language song because only "Dominique" by The Singing Nun and "Je t'aime... moi non plus" by Serge Gainsbourg and Jane Birkin had previously achieved such chart performance. It also peaked at No. 58 in Canada.

The single has sold over 900,000 copies around the world and is regarded as a "punk-new wave-pop classic."

Charts

Weekly charts

Year-end charts

Certifications and sales

Leila K version

Swedish singer and former rapper Leila K covered "Ça plane pour moi" in 1993. It was released as the second single from her first solo album, Carousel (1993). The song was produced by Denniz Pop and Douglas Carr, and achieved moderate success on the charts in many European countries. It peaked at No. 6 in Finland, No. 8 in Austria and Denmark, No. 13 in Germany, No. 16 in Belgium and No. 17 in Switzerland. On the Eurochart Hot 100, "Ça plane pour moi" reached No. 21 in May 1993.

Critical reception
Pan-European magazine Music & Media remarked that here, the Plastic Bertrand French-language punk classic had been "re-styled in an electronic dance fashion à la Billy Idol. Très bien!" Head of music Peter Kricek at Czech Republic's Bonton Radio/Prague told that the original out of 1978 was known in his country in the communist days, but it was more of an underground thing. He said, "The people here are absolutely mad about Leila's cover, which is a powerplay at our station. Every four hours we play it." Alan Jones from Music Week gave it three out of five, stating that the song "is transformed into technopunk by the self-proclaimed "queen of the divan" who, although better known as a rapper is in singing mode here." He also added that the Felix mixes on the CD and 12-inch "take it into trance territory. An odd combination, but likely to do well." Sylvia Patterson of Smash Hits praised Leila K's version, giving it five out of five and naming it Best New Single. She declared it as "brilliant", saying, "Phew! Ruck and Rool!! (Or whatever it is in French). A delirious synth whirl which hollers and spits and pouts not unlike EMF in a Electrolux spin-cycle without their guitars."

Track listing
 Maxi single (Urban 861 597-2)
"Ça plane pour moi" (Short) – 3:23 
"Check the Dan" (Short) – 3:55 
"Ça plane pour moi" (Long) – 5:48 
"Check the Dan" (Long) – 6:35

Charts

Weekly charts

Year-end charts

Other cover versions
In 1978, by  under the title "Bin wieder frei".
In 1979, by Telex on the album Looking for Saint Tropez.
In 1984, by Hermann Gunnarsson under the title "Einn dans við mig" on the album Frískur og Fjörugur.
In 1992, by Sonic Youth for a compilation album.
In 1997, by Thee Headcoatees on the album Punk Girls.
In 1998, by the Presidents of the United States of America on the album Rarities.
In 2006, by Richard Thompson on the album RT- The Life and Music of Richard Thompson.
In 2006, by Pigloo under the title "Ça plane pour moi (le twist)", as the third single from the album La Banquise. It reached number 18 on the French SNEP Singles Chart and remained in the top 100 for 24 weeks.
In 2009, by Nouvelle Vague on the album 3.
In 2019, by Metallica at a concert in King Baudouin Stadium, Brussels.

See also
List of number-one singles of 1978 (France)
List of number-one singles from 1968 to 1979 (Switzerland)

References

1977 songs
1977 singles
1978 singles
French-language songs
Plastic Bertrand songs
Kim Kay songs
Leila K songs
Patter songs
Pigloo songs
The Presidents of the United States of America (band) songs
Telex (band) songs
Sire Records singles
EMI Records singles
Number-one singles in France
Number-one singles in Switzerland
Song recordings produced by Denniz Pop